Pyanse or pigodi (pigodya) is a Russo-Korean steamed pie, bun, or dumpling stuffed with cabbage and meat. It is a popular dish in the Russian Far East, as well as in Koryo-saram communities of Central Asia.

Etymology 
The Russian word pigodi (plural) derived from pigodya (singular), which is the Russian transcription of the Koryo-mar word begoja.

History 
Pyanse is said to have first made in Kholmsk, Russia by Sakhalin Koreans in the early 1980s, as an adaptation of Korean wang-mandu ("king dumpling"). It has been the most popular street food in Vladivostok since the early 1990s, and became popular in Moscow in the 2010s.

See also 
 Morkovcha

References 

Dumplings
Russian Korean cuisine
Steamed buns
Street food in Russia
Soviet cuisine